Phaisan Hansawong (born October 21, 1989 in Buriram) is a Thai weightlifter.

At the 2007 World Championships he ranked 15th in the 56 kg category, with a total of 247 kg.

He competed in Weightlifting at the 2008 Summer Olympics in the 62 kg division finishing fifth, with 294 kg, beating his previous personal best by a considerable 47 kg.

He is 5 ft 5 inches tall and weighs 130 lb.

Notes and references

External links
 NBC profile
 Athlete Biography HANSAWONG Phaisan at beijing2008

Phaisan Hansawong
1989 births
Living people
Weightlifters at the 2008 Summer Olympics
Phaisan Hansawong
Phaisan Hansawong
Southeast Asian Games medalists in weightlifting
Competitors at the 2009 Southeast Asian Games
Phaisan Hansawong
Phaisan Hansawong